GoldenTree Asset Management is an American asset management firm that was founded in 2000. The firm has its headquarters in New York City and offices in Charlotte, North Carolina, Dublin, London, Singapore, Sydney, Tokyo, and West Palm Beach.

History
The firm was founded in 2000 by Steven Tananbaum. In 2021, GoldenTree had over 270 employees. The firm is ranked in Bloomberg’s 100 Top-Performing Large Hedge Funds.

Investment strategy
GoldenTree is a global credit manager that specializes in credit opportunities across high yield bonds, leveraged loans, distressed, structured products and emerging markets debt. GoldenTree manages over $47 billion for institutional investors including public and corporate pensions, endowments, foundations, and sovereign wealth funds.

References

External links
 Official website

Investment management companies of the United States
American companies established in 2000
2000 establishments in New York City
Privately held companies based in New York City